Simon David L. Atkins (born July 19, 1988) is a Filipino professional basketball player who last played for the Makati Super Crunch of the Maharlika Pilipinas Basketball League (MPBL). He was drafted first in the 23rd overall by the Air21 Express in the 2012 PBA draft. He played college ball for De La Salle University where he won a championship in 2007 with the Green Archers.

PBA career statistics

Correct as of October 19, 2016

Season-by-season averages

|-
| align=left | 
| align=left | Air21
| 25 || 10.8 || .302 || .250 || 1.000 || 1.4 || 1.5 || .3 || .0 || 2.0
|-
| align=left | 
| align=left | Air21
| 21 || 16.7 || .328 || .214 || .769 || 1.1 || 1.6 || .4 || .0 || 2.8
|-
| align=left | 
| align=left | Meralco
| 22 || 12.2 || .263 || .214 || .667 || 1.1 || 1.7 || .4 || .1 || 2.0
|-
| align=left | 
| align=left | Meralco
| 4 || 14.0 || .571 || .500 || 1.000 || .8 || 1.3 || .5 || .0 || 2.8
|-class=sortbottom
| align=center colspan=2 | Career
| 72 || 13.1 || .309 || .229 || .794 || 1.2 || 1.6 || .4 || .0 || 2.3

References

1988 births
Living people
Air21 Express players
Basketball players from Metro Manila
Filipino men's basketball players
Meralco Bolts players
People from Makati
Point guards
De La Salle Green Archers basketball players
Tagalog people
Maharlika Pilipinas Basketball League players
Air21 Express draft picks